2nd seeds Johan Brunström and Frederik Nielsen won the title, beating Francis Casey Alcantara and Christopher Rungkat 6–2, 6–2

Seeds

Draw

References
 Main Draw

2016 ATP Challenger Tour